The New Mexico Department of Cultural Affairs is a state agency of the New Mexico government. Created as the Office of Cultural Affairs (OCA) in 1980, the New Mexico Department of Cultural Affairs was elevated to a state Cabinet-level agency in 2004. The department oversees the state museum, monument, art, library, heritage preservation, and archaeology programs.

The Department of Cultural Affairs is currently directed by Cabinet Secretary Debra Garcia y Griego, who was nominated by Governor Michelle Lujan Grisham on December 26, 2018. The Cabinet Secretary appoints all of the Directors of the divisions

Divisions 
 Museum Resources Division
 Administrative Services Division
 New Mexico Arts
 New Mexico Historic Preservation Division
 New Mexico State Library
 National Hispanic Cultural Center
 Museum of New Mexico
 New Mexico Museum of Space History
 Farm and Ranch Heritage Museum

History 
The Cultural Affairs Department Act was passed by the New Mexico Legislature in 2004 "to create a single, unified department to administer all laws and exercise all functions formerly administered and executed by the office of cultural affairs." Prior to the 2004 legislation, the various divisions of the Department of Cultural Affairs had been governed by the Office of Cultural Affairs, an agency within the Educational Finance and Cultural Affairs Department.

References

External links
 

State agencies of New Mexico
New Mexico culture
1978 establishments in New Mexico